The Collège des Frères Maristes Champville is a private Marist catholic and French language educational institution set in Dik El Mehdi, Matn District, Lebanon. It is one of the major educational institutions in Lebanon, and one of the remaining two Marist schools in the country, the other one being Collège des Frères Maristes Jbeil - Amsheet, also known as Collège Notre Dame de Lourdes. The school, commonly known as Champville took its name from Saint Marcellin Champagnat, founder of the Marist Brothers, and it means "the city of Champagnat" (French: "la ville de Champagnat").

Presentation of the institution 
The Collège des Frères Maristes Champville is a private, christian catholic institution which declares its role to be to "serve Lebanon's youth within its rules and following the priorities set within its Educational Project". The college is directed by the Marist Brothers with the help of a secular educative team.

Facts and figures 
The college was founded in 1966 as a continuation of the Collège du Sacré-Cœur of Jounieh which was founded in 1903 by French missionaries. It lies upon a green hill in Dik El Mehdi, Northern Metn, Lebanon over about 22 hectares of surface. It now holds around 3000 students. The college teaches fifteen scholar years, divided into eight couples (except for the last year which comes alone). These eight are, in order:
 Nursery (Maternelles)
 Benjamins (Benjamins)
 Minimal (Minimes)
 Junior (Petits)
 Sophomore (Moyens)
 Seniors (Grands)
 Secondary (Secondaires)
 Terminal (Terminales)

The school usually averages highly in official exams, and enjoys a high standing among the Lebanese schools

Teaching and learning 
As one of the leading educational institutions in Lebanon, the College prepares its students to two baccalaureates (that is, the Lebanese and the French), the students can opt to take the Lebanese certificate only or both. The School provides a bilingual teaching of Arabic and French languages since they start. In the fourth grade, the College provides English language courses. From another perspective, the college gives scientific subjects the utmost importance and teaches Math and Sciences in preparatory classes, then Math, Biology and Physics - Chemistry in secondary classes. The three forms of baccalaureate a Collège des Frères Maristes Champville student can get are General Sciences (mainly Math and Physics), Life Sciences (mainly Biology and Chemistry) and Social and Economic Sciences (mainly Sociology and Economics). There is no Linguistic baccalaureate formation within the college which is why some people say that it is a purely scientific school (in French: Une école purement scientifique).
In parallel, the college provides DIY courses for students between the second and the eighth grades; Computer Studies between the second grade and second secondary grade; Media Instruction between the sixth and the ninth grades; and an initiation to editing TPE documents (French TPE = Travail Personnel Encadré, which translates to Personal Coached Work).

Timing 
The timetables of Maternelles and Benjamins spans over thirty weekly classes of fifty minutes' length each.
The timetables of all other classes, except Double-Baccalaureated classes in Second Secondary and in Senior level, span over thirty-five weekly classes of fifty minutes' length each. A particularity of this college in its recesses is that after each fifty-minute class, the students get a ten minutes break, but for the fifth fifty-minute classes. After the fifth class, they get a forty-minute break, during which they may head for one of the three cafeterias for lunch.
Double-Baccalaureated classes get four additional classes, on Tuesday and Thursday afternoons, in order to be able to satisfy the required learning for their two official exams.
A usual day at the college starts at 07:40 am and ends at 03:00 pm for usual classes. Maternelles and Benjamins start at 07:40 am as well, but leave at 02:30 pm, they also have breakfast served at school.

Extra-curriculars 
The college provides five options for extra-curricular activities: Sports, Cultural activities, Scouting, MEJ, and GVX (Christian Life Teaching).

Sports and cultural activities 
The Sports department of Champville organizes inter-grade tournaments in football, basketball, and more ball games. It also has the concept of Afternoon Athletism, which means that the sportsmen and sportswomen of the student body are able to train professionally with coaches after school.
For the cultural angle, the school welcomes all types of people to activities such as ballet, dance, painting, judo, tae-kwon-do, aikido, and other such activities, on Saturdays, between 9:00 am and 12:00 pm. Every year, the Activities' members (the member of any or both the sports and cultural activities) present a show in which they display what they have learnt during said year.

References

External links
Official website

Private schools in Lebanon